Nils Bergström (born March 7, 1985) is a Swedish ice hockey player.

Bergström made his Elitserien (now the SHL) debut playing with Rögle BK during the 2012–13 Elitserien season.

References

External links

1985 births
Living people
Swedish ice hockey centres
Rögle BK players
Timrå IK players
Malmö Redhawks players
People from Östersund
Sportspeople from Jämtland County